Heitor Villa-Lobos's Étude No. 2, part of his Twelve Études for Guitar, was first published by Max Eschig, Paris, in 1953.

Structure
The piece is in A major and is marked Allegro. A strong presence of J. S. Bach's Well-Tempered Clavier suggests a miniature Bachianas Brasileiras.

Analysis
Étude No. 2 is a study in slurred notes and arpeggios, developing a musical idea by Dionisio Aguado. A passage of great fingering difficulty occurs at the end, where Villa-Lobos combines harmonics and normal notes.

References

Cited sources

Further reading
 Villa-Lobos, sua obra. 2009. Version 1.0. MinC / IBRAM, and the Museu Villa-Lobos. Based on the third edition, 1989.
 Wright, Simon. 1992. Villa-Lobos. Oxford Studies of Composers. Oxford and New York: Oxford University Press.  (cloth);  (pbk).

Compositions by Heitor Villa-Lobos
Guitar études
Compositions in A major